"Sweet Dreams" is a song recorded by American singer Beyoncé from her third studio album I Am... Sasha Fierce (2008). Originally titled "Beautiful Nightmare", it leaked online in March 2008. The song was written and produced by Beyoncé, James Scheffer, Wayne Wilkins, and Rico Love. Columbia Records released "Sweet Dreams" as the album's sixth single, to mainstream radio and rhythmic contemporary radio playlists in the United States on June 2, 2009, and elsewhere on July 13. It is an electropop song whose instrumentation includes synthesizers, a keyboard, and snare drums. Beyoncé employs slinky vocals to sing the lyrics, which describe a romantic relationship that the female protagonist believes could be a dream.

Music critics praised the beats, synthpop sound and Beyoncé's vocals in "Sweet Dreams". Some critics noted that the sliding bassline gave the song a dark quality and resembles the one used in some of Michael Jackson's songs on Thriller (1982). "Sweet Dreams" gained popularity for its electronic style, which contrasts her earlier R&B, urban, and  releases. The song was nominated for the Viewers Choice Award at the 2010 BET Awards. "Sweet Dreams" peaked at number ten on the Billboard Hot 100. Outside of the United States, "Sweet Dreams" topped the charts in New Zealand, and peaked within the top ten of the charts in many countries, including Australia, the Czech Republic, the Republic of Ireland, Slovakia, and the United Kingdom. "Sweet Dreams" was certified platinum in the United States, Australia, and New Zealand.

The song's accompanying music video was directed by Adria Petty, and was filmed in Brooklyn, New York. The video sees Beyoncé wearing a golden robot suit designed by French fashion designer Thierry Mugler. Beyoncé promoted the song by performing it live at the 2009 MTV Europe Music Awards and occasionally during the I Am... World Tour (2009–10). "Sweet Dreams" was recognized as one of the most performed songs of 2009 at the 27th American Society of Composers, Authors and Publishers (ASCAP) Pop Music Awards. The song was used in a Cryster Geyser Water Japanese advertisement that featured Beyoncé.

Production and recording
Initially titled "Beautiful Nightmare", "Sweet Dreams" became one of the first songs composed for Beyoncé Knowles' 2008 double album I Am... Sasha Fierce. Record producer Rico Love regarded writing "Sweet Dreams" with Knowles as "the experience of a lifetime". When Knowles went to the South Beat Studios in Miami Beach, Florida, she was not prepared to record and had to attend the opening concert of her husband  tour. However, when she heard a demo of the song, she was impressed and wanted to record it immediately. She sang and recorded “Sweet Dreams” in 15 minutes. 

Knowles, Wayne Wilkins and Jim Jonsin did some additional writing and produced the song alongside Love at the same studio. Knowles and Love worked on the vocal arrangements; Knowles appreciated Love's background vocals in the hook and retained them. Jim Caruana assisted in recording the music. Love then recorded Knowles' vocals; the recording session lasted for an hour. Lastly, Wilkins mixed the track. "Sweet Dreams" appears on the Sasha Fierce disc of I Am... Sasha Fierce as it allowed Knowles to portray her alter ego Sasha Fierce, whom Knowles described as her "fun, more sensual, more aggressive, more outspoken [...] and more glamorous side".

Composition and lyrical interpretation

"Sweet Dreams" is an electropop song that incorporates elements of rock and  funk music. The song is built on undulating electro rhythms and a thumping beat; its groove fits into hip hop phrasing. It is mainly driven by a keyboard and also has guitar, piano, synthesizer, snare drum and bass instrumentation. Many music critics noted that several components of "Sweet Dreams" are reminiscent of the songs on Michael Jackson's 1982 album Thriller. James Montgomery of MTV News said that the "gnarly low end" sounds like Jackson's song "Beat It" (1983). Nick Levine of Digital Spy noted that the electronic bassline is similar to those used in Jackson's songs "Thriller" (1983) and "Bad" (1987). Arielle Castillo of the Miami New Times noted that Jackson could use the beat of "Sweet Dreams" to bring up to date his  style.

The lyrics of "Sweet Dreams" are about a female protagonist who has some insecurities about her new romantic relationship; she is confused about whether her relationship with her partner is a "sweet dream or a beautiful nightmare". The song starts with a bassline, which is occasionally interrupted by spare snare kicks, drum fills and Knowles' chanting, "Turn the lights on". She then adopts slinky vocals to begin the first verse. The  chorus then starts with the line, "You can be a sweet dream or a beautiful nightmare / Either way, I don't wanna wake up from you". The song is written in the key of E-flat minor with a tempo of 122 beats per minute. Beyoncé's vocals span from D♭4 to E5 in the song.

Leak and release
"Sweet Dreams" was leaked under its original title the day after it was recorded in March 2008, eight months before the album's release. It was the first time that a song by Knowles was leaked before its inclusion on an upcoming album. She responded to the leak on her official website, thanking her fans for the positive response towards the song, before clarifying that it was just a work in progress and that she did not intend to release new material in the near future. About the leak, Love told MTV News:

I was more concerned that [Beyoncé] would feel that we did it. A lot of times producers or songwriters leak records because they feel if you put the song out there it would go [on to become a hit]. Usually a leak that far in advance of an album release puts the song in serious jeopardy of being excluded from the final track list. It was frustrating. I felt like you work hard to get in the studio to work with Beyoncé. [But] I was blessed ... that song turned out [to] have nine lives.

Under the song's original title "Beautiful Nightmare", "Sweet Dreams" gained some attention in the United States, where it amassed enough airplay to chart at number  on Hot Dance Club Songs chart and at number  on Pop 100 Airplay chart.  "Broken-Hearted Girl" was initially intended as the sixth US and fourth international single alongside the stateside-only single "Ego" (2009). However, its release was scrapped at the last minute, and replaced by "Sweet Dreams", which Knowles selected for a summer single release because she wanted a dance song. She added, "It's very rare to find an uptempo song [...] that's not just about going to a club or partying or being a sexy girl".

"Sweet Dreams" was added to US contemporary hit radio and rhythmic contemporary radio playlists on June 2, 2009. Dance remixes of the song alongside the album version of "Ego" and its remixes were later released on the same digital EP on August 17, 2009, in the US.

Critical reception

Reviews 
"Sweet Dreams" was acclaimed by critics, some of whom praised its dark tone and electropop sound that is different from Knowles' previous work. James Montgomery of MTV News wrote that Knowles' vocals, which he called, "icy and cool, slippery like mercury [and] nothing to scoff at either", help make the song an "undeniable smash" that is unique compared to the work of other artists. Jennifer Vineyard of the same publication argued that the rock elements and smooth vocals contribute to Knowles' "fierce" alter ego, who "dares the listener to dream of her, warning that it might be a 'beautiful nightmare'." Arielle Castillo of Miami New Times noted that "Sweet Dreams" is another one of Jim Jonsin's productions with a keyboard-propelled arrangement, but unlike the material Jonsin crafted for Soulja Boy, the song is "swirling, and darker". Joey Guerra of the Houston Chronicle and Gary Trust of Billboard magazine agreed and said the song is one of Knowles' purest dance songs and is "an irresistible call to the dance floor". Describing "Sweet Dreams" as a "cool dance track", Dennis Amith of  complimented its arrangement, calling it "experimental" with "cool transitions".

Adam Mazmanian of The Washington Times described the song as "a gritty slow grind with a salacious bassline" and noted that Knowles "delivers a near parody of a  voice" while singing the chorus. Ryan Dombal of Pitchfork Media wrote that "Sweet Dreams" sounds like a song Rihanna would sing. Echoing Dombal's sentiments, Nick Levine of Digital Spy wrote that the best song on the Sasha Fierce disc is a "dark[ish] electropop track called 'Sweet Dreams', [which] actually sounds like the cousin of Rihanna's 'Disturbia'". On a separate review for the single, Levine awarded "Sweet Dreams" a rating of four stars out of five, and commented that the song seduces listeners with its catchy chorus hook, and thereafter keeps them intrigued by "placing a hint of darkness just beneath the shiny, synthy surface". Spence D. of IGN Music wrote that though "Sweet Dreams" is not a "stellar track", it is superior to other album tracks, including "Diva" and "Radio". Similarly, Vicki Lutas of BBC Music wrote that even though "Sweet Dreams" appears to lack something, it is undeniably a good song overall. She added that "Sweet Dreams" may not be Knowles' finest or most memorable work, but it remains her best offering since her 2003 song "Crazy in Love". Lutas also commended Knowles' vocal delivery, which he described as "beautiful and soft, yet strong and powerful". Talia Kraines of the same publication wrote that "Sweet Dreams" is one of the standout tracks on the Sasha Fierce disc though she believed Knowles did not get as experimental as she did on her 2006 song "Ring the Alarm".

Recognition and accolades
"Sweet Dreams" earned Knowles the Best Female Vocal accolade at the 2009 Music MP3 Awards. It was nominated for Best R&B/Urban Dance Track at the 25th Annual International Dance Music Awards, but lost to the Black Eyed Peas's 2009 song "I Gotta Feeling". It was also nominated for the Viewers Choice Award at the 2010 BET Awards. The American Society of Composers, Authors and Publishers (ASCAP) recognized "Sweet Dreams" as one of the most performed songs of 2009 at the 27th ASCAP Pop Music Awards. On the occasion of Knowles' thirtieth birthday, Erika Ramirez and Jason Lipshutz of Billboard magazine ranked the song at number 21 on their list of Knowles' 30 biggest Billboard hits, and noted that its electropop sound, which was in contrast to Knowles' previous singles, showcased her range of talent. On The Village Voices 2009 Pazz & Jop singles list, "Sweet Dreams" was ranked at number 115. In 2013, John Boone and Jennifer Cady of E! Online placed the song at number five on their list of ten best Knowles' songs, writing that Knowles "stepped away from R&B roots with this surreal electropop tune, which features these standout lyrics: 'My guilty pleasure, I ain't going nowhere / As long as you're here, I'll be floating on air' (which, from Bey's mouth, sounds like the greatest threat ever)".

Chart performance
"Sweet Dreams" debuted at number 97 on the US Billboard Hot 100 chart issue dated August 8, 2009. It peaked at number ten for two non-consecutive weeks on the charts issued dated November 7 and 21, 2009. Knowles' is the third song titled "Sweet Dreams" to reach the top ten of the Hot 100 chart, following "Sweet Dreams" by Air Supply in 1982 and "Sweet Dreams (Are Made of This)" by Eurythmics in 1983. For the week ending September 12, 2009, it topped the US Hot Dance Club Songs chart; it became Knowles' eleventh number-one song, and was the fourth song from I Am... Sasha Fierce to top that chart. "Sweet Dreams" tied Knowles with Kristine W for second-most number one songs on the Hot Dance Club Songs during the 2000s. "Sweet Dreams" was certified platinum by the Recording Industry Association of America (RIAA), denoting sales of one million digital copies. As of October 2012, it had sold 1,691,000 digital downloads in the US.

In the United Kingdom, "Sweet Dreams" debuted at number 52 on the UK Singles Chart on July 18, 2009. It peaked at number five on the UK Singles Chart on August 9, 2009 for three consecutive weeks, and became Knowles' eighth top ten single in Britain as a solo artist. In Australia, the song peaked at number two on the ARIA Singles Chart on August 9, 2009. The song spent 38 consecutive weeks on the ARIA Singles Chart, where it last charted on March 1, 2010; it was certified 3× platinum by the Australian Recording Industry Association (ARIA) for shipping 210,000 copies.

Music video

Background and concept

The accompanying music video for "Sweet Dreams" was directed by Adria Petty, whom Knowles chose because of her intelligence and beautiful visual references. After Knowles learned the choreography in Los Angeles, the video was shot in a studio in Brooklyn, New York City. It was the seventh video from the album, and the second to have complete color, being "Halo" the first. Knowles described it as more "graphic" when compared to the previous six videos, and commented it took "Sasha [Fierce] to the next level". In the video, Fierce is symbolized by the golden robot suit she wears; it was designed by French fashion designer Thierry Mugler.

The CGI was employed to create a context-less void, as the background was deleted and a void-like digital canvas was created for the dance routine that is executed by Knowles and her dancers Saidah Nairobi and Ashley Everett, who all sport numerous flashy and symmetrical costumes throughout the video. Accordingly, there were no concerns of cutting as the images were merged into one another using computers. A high number of camera lens glare effects was used in the video, part of which was inspired by British designer Gareth Pugh's Autumn/Winter 2009 video presentation. Knowles further commented about the fashion and choreography:

The fashion was extremely important in this video because everything was so minimal ... With the choreography, we really focused on hitting all of the accents in the drum beat. What makes this choreography so interesting is that in one instance, it is very staccato and hard... And the next instance; the movement is very smooth and there are lots of melts with inter-kit movement in the fingers and hands.

On June 12, 2009, a  video with Knowles dance rehearsal was released; Knowles was dressed in golden costumes and was performing some robotic movements. A  clip from the video was posted online on July 8, 2009; it showed Knowles alongside her two female  dancers in a virtual desert. The following day, the full video was leaked online but was soon deleted after Knowles' label issued warnings to infringing websites. The video for "Sweet Dreams" premiered on MTV later the same day.

Synopsis and analysis
The video opens with Knowles tossing and turning in her bed; her idea was to make the opening shot look like "a dark fairy tale". As she tries to sleep, Johannes Brahms's "Wiegenlied" plays softly in the background. She then levitates off her bed using her stomach muscles to move the top half of her body. Knowles said that the levitation shot was the hardest one as she had difficulties making her neck look straight. She added that the scene represents the nightmare and the white bird flying above her takes her into her dream, which unfolds after the screech of an electric guitar. Knowles is transported to a desert and several clouds are present in the background. She wears a black Roberto Cavalli dress and boots; as the music begins, her two backup dancers wearing Gareth Pugh pieces appear. The scene changes into a   landscape where Knowles is inscribed with a circle and square in a similar fashion to Leonardo da Vinci's Vitruvian Man. The first chorus is brought in by a subtle  sound effect as the  special effects disappear and Knowles appears in a silver  mini dress on a white background. Accompanied by her backup dancers, she performs dance moves described as "sophisticated", "street and ".

The second chorus shows Knowles wearing a  bodysuit while smashing mirrors. During the bridge, the video fades to black and white and Knowles appears wearing the gold robot suit, and gold and diamond nail rings valued at $US 36,000 and designed by Jules Kim. With it, she executes some robotic movements. As the chorus begins to play for the third and final time, digital doubling and mirroring are used to create a collection of dance moves and multiple images of Knowles arching her back. The gold outfit is then reused, this time in color. Knowles performs another dance routine with her two backup dancers, then says, "Turn the lights out", and the video ends.

Reception
He praised the way Knowles "[pops] her pelvis in ways never imagined", and the wardrobe changes in the clip, before concluding: "She expands on her burgeoning robot fetish, flashes the crazy eyes and contorts her body in downright unsettling ways. All of which is to say that 'Sweet Dreams' is just like every amazingly crazy Beyoncé video from the past three years, which — to extend the point — also means that it's pretty great." Olivia Smith of Daily News noted that in the video, Knowles references Jane Fonda in the movie Barbarella (1968), Tin Woodman and Pamela Anderson through the different costumes she wears. Smith further compared the video with the one for "Single Ladies (Put a Ring on It)", writing that Knowles reprises some of the moves she performed there. Brandon Soderberg of Slant Magazine described the introductory part of the video as a  mixture of eroticism and symbolism. He added that the video was "one part Victoria's Secret commercial, another part dream logic , and a  freakout all around", and commended the video for being "an excess of body and action, not filmic techniques", adding that the dancing in the video "blow[s] our minds anew".

Rolling Stone found similarities between the video for "Sweet Dreams", Kanye West's video for "Paranoid" (2009) and the cover artworks of English rock band Yes. Canadian magazine Dose also compared the video with "Paranoid" due to their similar dream sequences. Vicki Lutas of the BBC did not appreciate the first 30 seconds of the video, writing that "the dark, horror-type music, the pumping heartbeat, the equally spooky lullaby, the screech of an electric guitar", gave her the impression that she was watching "some [19]80s magician, with a Knowles soundtrack". However, she complimented the rest of the video writing that "things (thankfully) move away from the Hallowe'en cheese and into familiar Beyoncé territory (right from the fact it's proper [19]80s pop through to the video essentially being 'Single Ladies' with Beyoncé and 2 dancers)". Lutas concluded that the video might not be remembered for long or hailed as Beyoncé's finest and more memorable work, but it remains one of the best music videos from Knowles she has seen since "Crazy in Love". Nick Levine of Digital Spy compared the dancing moves in the video with those in "Single Ladies".

It was ranked at number 13 on BET's Notarized: Top 100 Videos of 2009 countdown. Tamar Anitai of MTV placed the video at number three on his list of the best five videos of 2009, wrote that it "isn't just another  look at Beyoncé", and continued, "It's the dark yin to the brighter, lighter fare of 'Single Ladies.' This is a  look at Beyoncé's life: Beyoncé the woman, Sasha Fierce the performer, and the powerful force that occupies the spaces in between." In 2013, John Boone and Jennifer Cady of E! Online placed the video at number ten on their list of Knowles' ten best music videos, praising Knowles' sexy robotic look.

Promotion

Knowles was due to perform "Sweet Dreams" at the 2009 MTV Video Music Awards on September 13. However, last minute changes were brought to her performance that night; wearing a leotard and a silver glove, Knowles sang a short drum-led remix of "Sweet Dreams" before switching to "Single Ladies", accompanied by two female backup dancers. Wearing a red Agent Provocateur corset, stockings and long satin gloves, Knowles sang "Sweet Dreams" at the MTV Europe Music Awards 2009 on November 5. Charly Wilder of Spin magazine commented that Knowles overshadowed American singer Katy Perry (host of the event) "with her mesmerizing,  rendition" of "Sweet Dreams".

"Sweet Dreams" was not regularly performed on the I Am... World Tour, a 2009–10 world tour in support of I Am... Sasha Fierce, but a video interlude featuring the song was included. Knowles sang an acoustic and downtempo rendition of the song live during the concert residency I Am... Yours that was held at the Encore Theater in Las Vegas on August 2, 2009. She blended it into a romantic medley that also included her 2003 song "Dangerously in Love 2" and Anita Baker's 1986 song "Sweet Love". The performance was subsequently included on her 2009 CD/DVD live album I Am... Yours: An Intimate Performance at Wynn Las Vegas. Knowles performed "Sweet Dreams" live at the Glastonbury Festival on June 6, 2011; she mixed it with "Sweet Dreams (Are Made of This)" by Eurythmics.

"Sweet Dreams" was used in a commercial for Crystal Geyser bottled water in which Knowles appeared; she dances and drinks water while the song is played in the background.

Cover versions
An unofficial remix of "Sweet Dreams", featuring American rappers Lil Wayne and Nicki Minaj, was included on Wayne's 2009 mixtape No Ceilings. English  duo the Big Pink covered the song in a live session for BBC Radio 1 on November 7, 2009. They also performed it at the 2010 Isle of Wight Festival on June 13, 2010. The cover later became the B-side to their 2010 single "Tonight". Jon Caramanica of The New York Times commented that their version had a "disarmingly flat affect, delivering it as the ramble of a neurotic" when compared to the original. Likewise, Pitchfork's Ryan Dombal felt that their cover "obliterates the original's  pulse, turning it into something a lot moodier and creepier".

On November 1, 2010, American professional basketball player, Shaquille O'Neal, dressed as his female alter ego Shaquita for Halloween, and gave a  performance of Knowles' "Sweet Dreams". In September 2011, Jade Collins covered "Sweet Dreams" during an episode of the ninth series of The X Factor. On October 27, 2012, boy band Union J covered the song during the same season of the show.

Jessica Sanchez version
On March 28, 2012, Jessica Sanchez, a contestant of the eleventh season of American Idol, covered "Sweet Dreams" performing a slow-tempo ballad version of the song accompanied at the beginning by harps. Her performance received favorable comments and a standing ovation from the judges of the show. Jennifer Lopez commented, "You did a beautiful job on it ... If I was Beyoncé and I was home and I heard that, I'd be like 'I got to do that in my next concert, slow that one down.'" Steven Tyler described Sanchez's performance as "great" while Randy Jackson noted that it was "unbelievable, sensational". James Montgomery of MTV News graded her performance with a B, and called the cover "a bit of an odd choice, and yet also a supremely confident one". He added, "For once, she pulled things back, and maybe suffered a bit for doing so, but there were still plenty of subtly great moments, particularly in the verses. Might not have been her best—it definitely lacked in vocal fireworks ... And really, it was good enough".

Mellisa Locker of Rolling Stone praised Sanchez's performance, calling it a "brilliant job" and adding that "it's risky, but Beyoncé has done it, and if anyone can pull off a dazzling repeat performance, it's Jessica". She further compared the performance with the dream sequence from the 1945 film Spellbound but noted that it was "slightly weirder". Jim Farber of the Daily News commented that "her take on a song by her clear role model, Beyoncé, showed too much similarity in their timbres and phrasing, making Sanchez's voice seem redundant ... despite the fact she switched up the arrangement of the bootylicious song she chose, 'Sweet Dreams.'" Amy Reiter of the Los Angeles Times wrote, "Sanchez gave yet another perfectly calibrated performance with Beyoncé's 'Sweet Dreams,' balancing restraint and power. Everything from her voice to her dress to the red door she walked through seemed polished and tour-ready". The Arizona Republics Randy Cordova praised the performance, saying that the slow-tempo version allowed Sanchez "to really delve into the song's emotional core".

Formats and track listings

"Ego / Sweet Dreams (Singles & Dance Mixes)"
 "Ego"  – 3:57
 "Ego" (DJ Escape & Johnny Vicious Club Remix)  – 8:22
 "Ego" (Slang "Big Ego" Club Remix)  – 6:18
 "Sweet Dreams"  – 3:28
 "Sweet Dreams" (OK DAC Club Remix)  – 5:14
 "Sweet Dreams" (Karmatronic Club Remix)  – 6:36

Germany digital EP
 "Sweet Dreams"  – 3:28
 "Sweet Dreams" (Groove Police Remix – Radio Edit)  – 3:10
 "Ego"  – 3:57
 "Ego" (Remix) [feat. Kanye West]  – 4:43
 "Sweet Dreams" (Video)  – 4:00
 "Ego" (Remix) [feat. Kanye West] (Video)  – 4:52

Digital EP
 "Sweet Dreams" (Dave Spoon Remix)   – 7:07
 "Sweet Dreams" (Steve Pitron & Max Sanna Remix – Radio Edit)   – 3:37
 "Sweet Dreams" (Steve Pitron & Max Sanna Club Remix)   – 7:38
 "Sweet Dreams" (Oli Collins & Fred Portelli Remix)   – 5:38
 "Sweet Dreams"  – 3:28

Digital single; Germany and UK CD single
 "Sweet Dreams"  – 3:28
 "Sweet Dreams" (Steve Pitron & Max Sanna Remix) [Radio Edit]  – 3:35

UK download single

 "Sweet Dreams"  – 3:28

Credits and personnel
Credits are taken from I Am... Sasha Fierce liner notes.
Beyoncé Knowles – lead vocals, music producer, songwriter
Rico Love – vocal producer, music producer, songwriter, additional vocals
Jim Caruana – recording engineer
James Scheffer – music producer, songwriter
Wayne Wilkins – songwriter, audio mixer, music producer

Charts

Weekly charts

Year-end charts

Certifications

Release history

See also

List of Billboard Hot Dance Club Play number ones of 2009
List of Billboard Rhythmic number-one songs of the 2000s
List of number-one singles from the 2000s (New Zealand)

Notes

References

External links

2008 songs
2009 singles
Beyoncé songs
Columbia Records singles
Electropop songs
Number-one singles in New Zealand
Songs about dreams
Song recordings produced by Beyoncé
Song recordings produced by Jim Jonsin
Song recordings produced by Rico Love
Songs written by Beyoncé
Songs written by Jim Jonsin
Songs written by Rico Love
Songs written by Wayne Wilkins